Renk Airport is an airport serving Renk in South Sudan.

Location
Renk Airport  is located in Renk County in Eastern Nile, in the town of Renk, in the northeastern part of South Sudan. The airport is located southwest of the central business district of the town, and lies between Renk and its southern suburb of Abbeit.

The geographic coordinates of this airport are: Latitude: 11.8300; Longitude: 32.8000. The airport has a single unpaved runway, the dimensions of which are not publicly known at this time.

Overview
Renk Airport is a small civilian airport that serves the town of Renk and surrounding communities. There are no known scheduled airlines serving this airport at this time.

See also
 Renk, South Sudan
 Renk County
 Upper Nile (state)
 Greater Upper Nile
 List of airports in South Sudan

References

External links
 Location of Renk Airport At Google Maps
 Locator Map At Aviador.es

Airports in South Sudan
Upper Nile (state)
Greater Upper Nile